The wedge plow or Bucker plow was first developed by railroad companies to clear snow in the American West. The wedge plow forces snow to the sides of the tracks and therefore requires a large amount of force due to the compression of snow. The wedge plow is still in use today in combination with the high-maintenance rotary snowplow.

Function
Three features are required for optimum performance:
 The plow has a smooth surface so snow will slide over the plow face rather than accumulating to be pushed along as an increasing mass. Wooden plows were carefully constructed of individually fitted boards and painted frequently to maintain a smooth surface. Steel plows can be sprayed with water in sub-freezing temperatures to form a smooth layer of ice on the plow surface.
 The plow has a horizontal wedge to lift snow above the level of snow accumulation beside the track. A cutting edge low above the rails usually employed a cast iron or steel leading edge for durability against ice and for weight to discourage the tendency of the wedge to climb over hard-packed snow causing derailment by lifting the wheels off the rails. Under most conditions, the tendency to climb was reduced by weight of snow on the upper side of the wedge, and by downward reaction force accompanying upward acceleration of lifted snow. However, this downward snow loading may be absent when a plow first strikes a snow drift or packed snow face where the plow train has previously stalled. Before making a running start against such conditions, prudent crews would dig into the lower edge of the drift or snow face creating a notch to receive and guide the leading edge of the horizontal wedge.
 The plow has a vertical wedge to push the snow horizontally away from the track. The vertical wedge may be less acute than the horizontal wedge, but often included a cast or sheet metal cutting edge on wooden plows. Pushing snow horizontally off the track may create an unbalanced horizontal force where asymmetrical snow accumulation is encountered. (such as snow drifting into one side of a cut) This unbalanced force may derail the plow. The leading edge of the horizontal wedge is typically forward of the vertical wedge so stabilizing downward snow loading precedes horizontal loads.

Well-designed wedge plows work best at speeds which accelerate the snow first upward and transitioning to a horizontal acceleration casting the snow far enough from the track to avoid creating high, vertical snowbanks which would leave the cleared track a sheltered deposition site for wind-blown snow.

History

Early roads were often rolled rather than plowed to compact accumulated snow into a surface suitable for sleighs drawn by draft animals. Rail transportation brought the requirement for snow removal by plows. In the 1840s railway companies began using Bucker plows to remove snow from railways. The first incarnation of the wedge plow was the Bucker plow which was made of wood. Because of the amount of capital invested in railroads, the railways were required to be functional year-round. Because of this, snow needed to be cleared from the railways in an efficient manner. The wedge plow was patented by Charles Lowbaert to keep railways functional during the winter.

The wedge plow typically required several locomotives to propel the plow with enough force to push through the snow. Sometimes, as many as 14 locomotives were used in the process. In the case where snow was tightly packed or frozen, manual labor might still be used to clear the tracks. The process of 'ramming' through snow was accounted by historically as follows.

"The pushing and backing of the engines made a din unequalled since the blacksmithy of the Cyclops. By some hocus pocus the seven engines were made to pull togethers. After three hours of toil-there was a tremendous jerk, a forward movement of a few moments and we were abreast of the station."

Henry David Thoreau also noted in his poems the "steady and cheerful valor of the men who inhabit the snow-plough for their winter quarters...and [to] behold the ploughmen covered with snow and rime, their heads peering above the mould-board."

Plowing was therefore a dangerous job with the chance of derailing the train in the process. Wedge plows are still currently used by railways as a less expensive method for clearing snow drifts from the tracks. During heavier snow conditions, rotary snowplows are used.

Preservation

See also

 Pilot (locomotive)
 Rotary snowplow
 Snowplow
 Transcontinental railroad

Notes

References

Maintenance of way equipment
Snowplows